Cyrus Levinthal (May 2, 1922 – November 4, 1990) was an American molecular biologist.

Biography
Levinthal graduated with a Ph.D. in physics from University of California, Berkeley and taught physics at the University of Michigan for seven years before moving to the Massachusetts Institute of Technology (MIT) in 1957.  In 1968 he joined Columbia University as the Chairman and from 1969 Professor of the newly established Department of Biological Sciences, where he remained until his death from lung cancer in 1990.

Research

While at MIT Levinthal made significant discoveries in molecular genetics relating to the mechanisms of DNA replication, the relationship between genes and proteins, and the nature of messenger RNA.

At Columbia Levinthal applied computers to the 3-dimensional imaging of biological structures such as proteins. He is considered the father of computer graphical display of protein structure.

Discoveries and accomplishments

See Levinthal's paradox.

References

External links
 Cyrus Levinthal on Columbia University website
 Early Interactive Molecular Graphics at MIT

1922 births
1990 deaths
American molecular biologists
American geneticists
University of California, Berkeley alumni
University of Michigan faculty
Computational chemists
Massachusetts Institute of Technology faculty
Columbia University faculty
Members of the National Academy of Medicine